was a Japanese company established 1962, and was a wholly owned subsidiary of Sony Corporation. In 2008, Sony Chemical & Information Device transferred its thermal transfer ink ribbon business to Dai Nippon Printing. In 2012, Sony Chemicals Corporation was separated from Sony Group and renamed Dexerials Corporation. As of 2020, Sekisui Chemical is the largest shareholder of the corporation.

Holdings
 Sony Chemicals Corporation of America (100%)

Categories of product
 Electronic materials and parts
 Joining materials
 Others

External links
 Sony Chemicals Corporation

References 

Chemicals
Chemical companies based in Tokyo